"They'll Know We Are Christians" (also known as "They'll Know We Are Christians By Our Love" or "We Are One in the Spirit") is a Christian hymn written in the 1960s by then-Catholic priest, the late Fr. Peter Scholtes. The title of the hymn They'll Know We Are Christians By Our Love originates in a phrase that non-believers used to describe Christians believers of early Church: "Behold, how they love one another."

It was released on an LP of the same name featuring the congregation of Fr. Scholtes' church, St. Brendan's on the South Side of Chicago singing this hymn and others.

Covers 
The song has been covered by a variety of Christian recording artists, including Jars of Clay, Rebecca St. James, Jason Upton, Lydia Walker, and For King & Country, which covered the song for the show "A.D, the Bible Continues." The song was also featured in the opening of the Christian movie “A Distant Thunder.”

See also
Contemporary Catholic liturgical music
List of English-language hymnals by denomination
List of Roman Catholic hymns

References

Contemporary Christian songs
Contemporary Catholic liturgical music
1968 songs